Robert Jay Lifton (born May 16, 1926) is an American psychiatrist and author, chiefly known for his studies of the psychological causes and effects of wars and political violence, and for his theory of thought reform. He was an early proponent of the techniques of psychohistory.

Biography

Lifton was born in 1926, in Brooklyn, New York, the son of businessman Harold A. Lifton, and Ciel Lifton née Roth. In 1942, he enrolled at Cornell University at the age of 16. He was admitted to New York Medical College in 1944, graduating in 1948. He interned at the Jewish Hospital of Brooklyn in 1948–49. He did his psychiatric residence training at the Downstate Medical Center, Brooklyn, New York in 1949–51.

From 1951 to 1953, Lifton served as an Air Force psychiatrist in Japan and Korea, to which he later attributed his interest in war and politics. He has since worked as a teacher and researcher at the Washington School of Psychiatry, Harvard University, and the John Jay College of Criminal Justice, where he helped to found the Center for the Study of Human Violence.

He married the children's writer Betty Jean Kirschner in 1952, and they had two children. She died in Boston on November 19, 2010, from complications of pneumonia. Lifton has said that cartooning is his avocation; he has published two books of humorous cartoons about birds.

He is a member of Collegium International, an organization of leaders with political, scientific, and ethical expertise whose goal is to provide new approaches in overcoming the obstacles in the way of a peaceful, socially just and an economically sustainable world. In 2012, Lifton was awarded an Honorary Doctorate from The New School.

Wellfleet Psychohistory Group

During the 1960s, Lifton, together with his mentor Erik Erikson and historian Bruce Mazlish of MIT, formed a group to apply psychology and psychoanalysis to the study of history. Meetings were held at Lifton's home in Wellfleet, Massachusetts. The Wellfleet Psychohistory Group, as it became known, focused mainly on psychological motivations for war, terrorism, and genocide in recent history. In 1965, they received sponsorship from the American Academy of Arts and Sciences to establish psychohistory as a separate field of study. A collection of research papers by the group was published in 1975: Explorations in Psychohistory: The Wellfleet Papers (see Bibliography; Lifton as editor). Lifton's work in this field was deeply influenced by Erikson's studies of Hitler and other political figures, as well as by Sigmund Freud's concern with the mass social effects of deep-seated drives, particularly attitudes toward death.  The attendees  include Erikson, Lifton, and Kenneth Keniston at the ‘continuous core’ of annual meetings, along with Bruce Mazlish, Norman Birnbaum, Alexander and Margaret Mitscherlich, Margaret Brennen, Peter Brooks, Robert Coles, Lloyd and Susanne Rudolph, Charles Strozier, Philip Rieff, Kai Erikson, Betty Jean Lifton, Norman Mailer,  Howard Zinn, Frederick Wyatt, Noam Chomsky, Richard Sennett, Peter Gay, Ashis Nandy, Richard Goodwin, Harvey Cox, Frank Manuel, Leo Marx, Jonathan Schell, Raoul Hilberg, Sudhir Kakar, David Dellinger, Dan Berrigan, Wendy Doniger, Cathy Caruth, David Riesman, Steve Marcus, Richard Barnet, Daniel Ellsberg, Richard Falk, Hillel Levine, Aaron Roland and many others until it closed shop in 2015.

Studies of thought reform
Beginning in 1953, Lifton interviewed American servicemen who had been prisoners of war (POWs) during the Korean War, in addition to priests and students, or teachers who had been held in prison in China after 1951. In addition to interviews with 25 Americans and Europeans, Lifton interviewed 15 Chinese who had fled after having been subjected to indoctrination in Chinese universities.

Lifton's 1961 book, Thought Reform and the Psychology of Totalism: A Study of "Brainwashing" in China, based on this research, was a study of coercive techniques used in the People's Republic of China. He described this process as "thought reform" or "brainwashing", though he preferred the former term. The term "thought-terminating cliché" was popularized in this book. Lifton found that after the POWs returned to the United States, their thinking soon returned to normal, contrary to the popular image of "brainwashing" as resulting in permanent changes. A 1989 reprint edition was published by University of North Carolina Press.

Studies of war and atrocity survivors

Several of his books featured mental adaptations that people made in extreme wartime environments: Death in Life: Survivors of Hiroshima (1967), Home from the War: Vietnam Veterans—Neither Victims nor Executioners (1973), and The Nazi Doctors: Medical Killing and the Psychology of Genocide (1986). Regarding Hiroshima and Vietnam survivors or Nazi perpetrators, Lifton believed that the psychic fragmentation suffered by his subjects was an extreme form of the pathologies that arise in peacetime life due to the pressures and fears of modern society.

His studies of the behavior of people who had committed war crimes, both individually and in groups, concluded that while human nature is not innately cruel and only rare sociopaths can participate in atrocities without suffering lasting emotional harm, such crimes do not require any unusual degree of personal evil or mental illness. He says that they are nearly sure to happen given certain conditions (either accidental or deliberately arranged), which Lifton called "atrocity-producing situations". The Nazi Doctors was the first in-depth study of how medical professionals rationalized their participation in the Holocaust, from the early stages of the T-4 Euthanasia Program to the extermination camps.

In the Hiroshima and Vietnam studies, Lifton also concluded that the sense of personal disintegration that many people experienced after witnessing death and destruction on a mass scale could ultimately lead to a new emotional resilience—but that without the proper support and counseling, most survivors would remain trapped in feelings of unreality and guilt. In her 2005 autobiography My Life So Far, Jane Fonda described Lifton's work with Vietnam veterans, along with that of fellow psychiatrists Leonard Neff, Chaim Shatan, and Sarah Haley, as "tireless and empathetic".

In 1975, the BBC adapted Lifton's book Death in Life as Episode 31 in Season 11 of their program Horizon.  The documentary, To Die, To Live, The Survivors of Hiroshima, was written and directed by Robert Vas, and edited by Peter Goodchild. The program aired on August 6, 1975.  In a New York Times review, John Leonard wrote, "I didn't want to watch a whole hour of it. I got the point. I was suspicious of the cultivated European voices translating the words of the survivors. I resented the ominous music, the pregnant pauses, the mechanical alternations of scenes of modern Hiroshima in livid, living color with the black‐and-white disaster footage of 1945 newsreels. Where was the center of this irony and at whose expense? I disliked the manipulation of my emotions by crude juxtaposings of disfigured women and department store mannequins with American wigs, of missing ears and honky‐tonk acts, of a river of corpses and night baseball. I thought the subtleties of Dr. Lifton's book were obscured by a piling‐on of images intended, and guaranteed, to shock. Mutilated bodies look the same, don't they, at death camps and at Dresden and at train wrecks? What, in this wretched century, is so special about Hiroshima?"

Lifton was one of the first organizers of therapeutic discussion groups on this subject in which mental health practitioners met with veterans face-to-face. He and Dr. Neff successfully lobbied for the inclusion of post-traumatic stress disorder in the Diagnostic and Statistical Manual of Mental Disorders (DSM). His book on Hiroshima survivors won the 1969 National Book Award in Science.

Theories of totalism and the protean self

Totalism, a word which he first used in Thought Reform, is Lifton's term for the characteristics of ideological movements and organizations that desire total control over human behavior and thought. Lifton's usage differs from theories of totalitarianism, as it can be applied to the ideology of groups that do not wield governmental power.

In Lifton's opinion, though such attempts always fail, they follow a common pattern and cause predictable types of psychological damage in individuals and societies. He finds two common motives in totalistic movements: the fear and denial of death, channeled into violence against scapegoat groups that set up to represent a metaphorical threat to survival, and a reactionary fear of social change.

In his later work, Lifton has focused on defining the type of change to which totalism is opposed, for which he coined the term the protean self. In the book of the same title, he states that the development of a "fluid and many-sided personality" is a positive trend in modern societies. He said that mental health now requires "continuous exploration and personal experiment", which requires the growth of a purely relativist society that is willing to discard and diminish previously established cultures and traditions.

Critiques of modern war and terrorism

Following his work with Hiroshima survivors, Lifton became a vocal opponent of nuclear weapons, arguing that nuclear strategy and warfighting doctrine made even mass genocide banal and conceivable. While not a strict pacifist, he has spoken against U.S. military actions in his lifetime, particularly the Vietnam War and Iraq War, believing that they arose from irrational and aggressive aspects of American politics motivated by fear.

In 1993, he said:
What's happening there [in Bosnia] merits the use of the word genocide. There is an effort to systematically destroy an entire group. It's even been conceptualized by Serbian nationalists as so-called "ethnic cleansing." That term signifies mass killing, mass relocation, and that does constitute genocide.Lifton regards terrorism as an increasingly serious threat due to the proliferation of nuclear and chemical weapons and totalist ideologies. He has, however, criticized the Bush administration's "War on Terrorism" as a misguided and dangerous attempt to "destroy all vulnerability". His 1999 book, Destroying the World to Save It, described the apocalyptic terrorist sect Aum Shinrikyo as a forerunner of "the new global terrorism".

Appearances
Lifton is featured in the 2003 documentary Flight From Death, a film that investigates the relationship of human violence to fear of death, as related to subconscious influences. In 2006, Lifton appeared in a documentary on cults on the History Channel, Decoding the Past, along with fellow psychiatrist Peter A. Olsson. On May 18, 2008, Lifton delivered the commencement address at Stonehill College and discussed the apparent "Superpower Syndrome" experienced by the United States in the modern era.
In 2018 he also appears in the documentary Metamorphosis, about climate change and positive changes towards a more sustainable future.

Bibliography

 ; Reprinted, with a new preface: University of North Carolina Press, 1989 (Online at Internet Archive).
 Death in Life: Survivors of Hiroshima, Random House (New York City), 1968.
 Revolutionary Immortality: Mao Tse-Tung and the Chinese Cultural Revolution, Random House, 1968.
 Birds, Words, and Birds (cartoons), Random House, 1969.
 History and Human Survival: Essays on the Young and the Old, Survivors and the Dead, Peace and War, and on Contemporary Psychohistory, Random House, 1970.
 Boundaries, Canadian Broadcasting Corporation (Toronto), 1969, published as Boundaries: Psychological Man in Revolution, Random House, 1970.
 Home from the War: Vietnam Veterans—Neither Victims nor Executioners, Simon & Schuster (New York City), 1973.
 (With Eric Olson) Living and Dying, Praeger, 1974.
 The Life of the Self: Toward a New Psychology, Simon & Schuster, 1976.
 Psychobirds, Countryman Press, 1978.
 (With Shuichi Kato and Michael Reich) Six Lives/Six Deaths: Portraits from Modern Japan (originally published in Japanese as Nihonjin no shiseikan, 1977), Yale University Press (New Haven, CT), 1979.
 The Broken Connection: On Death and the Continuity of Life, Simon & Schuster, 1979.
 (With Richard A. Falk) Indefensible Weapons: The Political and Psychological Case against Nuclearism, Basic Books (New York City), 1982.
 The Nazi Doctors: Medical Killing and the Psychology of Genocide, Basic Books, August 2000 (first edition 1986).
 The Future of Immortality and Other Essays for a Nuclear Age, Basic Books, 1987.
 (With Eric Markusen) The Genocidal Mentality: Nazi Holocaust and Nuclear Threat, Basic Books, 1990.
 The Protean Self: Human Resilience in an Age of Fragmentation, Basic Books, 1993.
 (With Greg Mitchell) Hiroshima in America: Fifty Years of Denial, Putnam's (New York City), 1995.
 Destroying the World to Save It: Aum Shinrikyo, Apocalyptic Violence, and the New Global Terrorism, Owl Books, 2000.
 (With Greg Mitchell) Who Owns Death? Capital Punishment, the American Conscience, and the End of Executions, Morrow, 2000.
 Superpower Syndrome: America's Apocalyptic Confrontation With the World, Nation Books, 2003.

Lifton as editor

 (With Jacob D. Lindy)Beyond Invisible Walls: The Psychological Legacy of Soviet Trauma, East European Therapists and Their Patients, Edwards Brothers (Lillington, NC), 2001.
 The Woman in America, Houghton (Boston), 1965.
 America and the Asian Revolutions, Trans-Action Books, 1970, second edition, 1973.
 (With Richard A. Falk and Gabriel Kolko) Crimes of War: A Legal, Political-Documentary, and Psychological Inquiry into the Responsibilities of Leaders, Citizens, and Soldiers for Criminal Acts of War, Random House, 1971.
 (With Eric Olson) Explorations in Psychohistory: The Wellfleet Papers, Simon & Schuster, 1975.
 (With Eric Chivian, Susanna Chivian, and John E. Mack) Last Aid: The Medical Dimensions of Nuclear War, W. H. Freeman, 1982.
 (With Nicholas Humphrey) In a Dark Time: Images for Survival, Harvard University Press, 1984.

Awards 

 1987: National Jewish Book Award in the Holocaust category for The Nazi Doctors: Medical Killing and the Psychology of Genocide

See also
Destructive cult
List of cult researchers

References

External links

Articles
 Evil, the Self, and Survival: interview by Harry Kreisler, 1999
 Doctors and Torture: Lifton discusses "atrocity-producing situations" in the case of the Abu Ghraib prisoner abuse, 2004
 Superpower Syndrome articles. Robert Jay Lifton on superpower syndrome, TomDispatch, 2006.
 The End of Life: Exploring Death in America "Doctors and Death" Transcript, All Things Considered, Jan. 4
 Hiroshima and the World: The Wisdom of Survivors  article in the Chugoku Shimbun.
Media
 Talk on Apocalyptic Violence 
 Flight From Death. Robert Jay Lifton is interviewed in this documentary film.
 Bill Moyers Interviews Robert Jay Lifton: about the aftermath of September 11 terrorist attacks, 2002
 Religious and Ethnic Conflict Abroad Talk of the Nation, September 15, 1999
 Doomsday Cults/Apocalyptic Groups Morning Edition, April 7, 2000
 
 Interview with Steven Hassan Freedom of Mind, July 13, 2011
 Interview with Steven Hassan Freedom of Mind, August, 2012
with Robert Jay Lifton by Stephen McKiernan, Binghamton University Libraries Center for the Study of the 1960s, August 10, 2010
To Die, To Live, The Survivors of Hiroshima (1975), hosted on the Internet Archive

NPR Fresh Air interviews:
 October 19, 2001
 December 18, 2001
 September 11, 2002
 June 6, 2002
 February 5, 2003
 April 8, 2003

1926 births
Living people
Weill Cornell Medical College alumni
Harvard University staff
Military personnel from New York City
John Jay College of Criminal Justice faculty
American psychiatrists
Mind control theorists
Researchers of new religious movements and cults
National Book Award winners
21st-century American non-fiction writers
20th-century American historians
Jewish American historians
Jewish American social scientists
American psychology writers
American anti-war activists
American anti–nuclear weapons activists
New York Medical College alumni
20th-century American male writers
American male non-fiction writers
Historians from New York (state)
21st-century American male writers
21st-century American Jews